Ulubey may refer to:
 Ulubey, Ordu, a district of Ordu Province, Turkey
 Ulubey, Uşak, a district of Uşak Province, Turkey
 Ulubey Canyon, a canyon in the district